

Archosaurs

Newly named pseudosuchians
Data courtesy of George Olshevsky's dinosaur genera list.

Paleontologists
 Birth of Harry Govier Seeley, the paleontologist who invented the Saurischian/Ornithischian dinosaur dichotomy.

References

1830s in paleontology
Paleontology